Needhipathi is a 1955 Indian Tamil language film directed by A. S. A. Sami. The film featured K. R. Ramasamy, Gemini Ganesan, Rajasulochana and M. N. Rajam in the lead roles.

Cast 

K. R. Ramasamy
Gemini Ganesan
T. S. Balaiah
S. V. Sahasranamam
D. Balasubramaniam
Yadhartham Ponnusamy Pillai
C. S. Pandian
M. K. Mustapha
Karikol Raj
S. V. Shanmugam
V. S.. Nadesan
Sankaramurthi
M. S. Karupiah
T. K. Gopal
Rajagopal
Ponnusamy
C. V. Velappan
Veerasamy
T. A. Natarajan
Rajasulochana
M. N. Rajam
K. Malathi
T. D. Kusalakumari
E. V. Saroja
L. Vijayalakshmi
P. Dhanam
Renganayagi
P. S. Muthulakshmi
Seethalakshmi

Soundtrack 
Music was composed by the duo Viswanathan–Ramamoorthy assisted by G. K. Venkatesh while the lyrics were penned by A. Maruthakasi, Udumalai Narayana Kavi and Kannadasan. Singer is K. R. Ramasamy while the Playback singers are C. S. Jayaraman, T. M. Soundararajan, T. V. Rathnam, N. L. Ganasaraswathi, K. Jamuna Rani and A. P. Komala. As per film credits, Gajalakshmi and S. J. Kantha also lent their voices for a group song.

References

External links 

Indian drama films
Indian courtroom films
Indian films based on plays
Films scored by Viswanathan–Ramamoorthy
1955 drama films
Indian black-and-white films